Captain Bharat Khawas (born 22 July 1991) is Nepalese footballer & Army Officer. He plays for club Tribhuvan Army Club in Martyr's Memorial A-Division League as a striker and currently ranked in captain position of Nepal Army.

Club career 
Bharat Khawas is an ANFA academy product who has represented Nepal in different age limit competitions and the National team as well. He rejected a European club chance for the sake of playing in AFC Challenge Cup 2012. Later it was found that the club was none other than Valletta FC from Maltese Premier League. The club had offered him a salary of 150,000 Nepali Rupees per month. He signed for Tribhuwan Army from Nepal Police club having offered second lieutenant post at Nepal Army.

On 7 June 2014 in the Khawas scored a last minute winner in Nepal Army Club's 3–1 win over arch rivals (and Khawas's former team) Nepal Police Club in the 2014 Bir Ganesh Man Singh Gold Cup Final. As the winning team the Nepali Army Club will receive 5 Lakhs (500,000 rupees) prize. Afterwards Khawas thanked the Army for allowing him to play on the team while completing his cadet course.

International 
He wears the number 21 jersey for the international team.

International goals 
Scores and results list Nepal's goal tally first.

Award
2013-14 Martyr's Memorial A-Division League: Best Forward
2018-19 Martyr's Memorial A-Division League: Best Forward
2019-20 Martyr's Memorial A-Division League: Best Forward

References

External links 
 

1992 births
Living people
Sportspeople from Kathmandu
Nepalese footballers
Nepal international footballers
Association football forwards
Footballers at the 2014 Asian Games
Asian Games competitors for Nepal
Nepalese expatriate sportspeople in India
Nepalese military personnel